Mikko Lehtinen (born 13 November 1975 in Lahti) is a Finnish film director and founding president of the London-based production company Sauna International Ltd..  Mikko studied directing, TV commercial design, theatre directing and cultural history and started as a production assistant on MTV3 channel. After a few years he moved away from production on to directing where he has stayed to this day.

Career 
Since 2004 Lehtinen has directed films from Hungry Man before his three years partnership at Tantrum Productions, which came to an end in March 2010. Before moving to London Mikko had already made himself an award-winning name in his native Finland.

Lehtinen has worked for international production companies including Yellow House, Close Up, 539090, The Fabulous Boomtown boys, Forward International and directed TV commercials for many well-known brands like IKEA, Coca-Cola, Virgin Mobile, Volkswagen, Land Rover, Milka and Sprite.

In 2002 the City Magazine Helsinki chose him among the 50 young hopefuls emerging from Finland. In the same list there were for example Formula 1 driver Heikki Kovalainen, conductor Mikko Franck, Dallas Stars goaltender Kari Lehtonen and designer Paola Suhonen whose Ivana Helsinki clothing brand was recently sued by Ivana Trump.

In August 2010, Lehtinen decided to move on and set up his own production company Sauna International Ltd. Sauna has actually been trading since 2004 but until 2010 it was more of a think tank than anything else.

Sauna's new launch was reported widely for example in the Finnish Markkinointi & Mainonta (Marketing & Advertising) Magazine and in the English industry website The Reel.

Awards 
Lehtinen's work has been awarded several times in the advertising industry competitions around the world, including The New York Festivals, Cannes Lions, Epica Awards,  D&AD, Effie Awards, Montreux, and "Best Ads on Tv".

References 

1975 births
Living people
People from Lahti